The Apapocúva (Apapokuva), also known as the Nandeva, are an agricultural Tupian tribe of the  group of southern Brazil, living in the state of São Paulo. Population: 500.

References

Ethnic groups in Brazil
Indigenous peoples in Brazil